Alauca is a municipality in the Honduran department of El Paraíso.

References

Municipalities of the El Paraíso Department